The Government Dharmapuri Medical College is an educational institution established in 2008 at Nethaji Bye Pass Road within Dharmapuri Municipality in Indian state of Tamil Nadu. The college accepts 100 students per year, of which 85 are state quota seats and 15 are from the All India quota. It is a Medical Council of India (MCI) recognized medical college. The Foundation stone was laid down by deputy CM M.K  on 19.01.2010. It has performed around 3000 surgeries under the Chief Ministers Comprehensive Health Insurance Scheme.

Hospital Services 
It has OPD & IPD services. It includes well equipped operation theatre with laboratory & blood bank services.

special clinics are being conducted.
 Club Foot clinic - every Saturday.
 Congenital Defects Screening Clinic - every Friday.
 Hypertension Clinic - every Tuesday and Thursday
 Diabetic Clinic - every Tuesday and Thursday. 
 Transgender Clinic - every Monday and Saturday.
 Glaucoma Clinic - every Monday and  Saturday.
 Cornea Clinic -  every Monday and  Saturday.
 Teen Clinic - every Saturday.

References

External links 
 
 Medical Council of India 
 Government of Tamil Nadu Health and Family Welfare Department

Medical colleges in Tamil Nadu
Education in Dharmapuri district